Pat Morris Neff (November 26, 1871 – January 20, 1952) was an American politician, educator and administrator, and the 28th Governor of Texas from 1921 to 1925, ninth President of Baylor University from 1932 to 1947, and twenty-fifth president of the Southern Baptist Convention from 1944 to 1946. He served as Grand Master of Masons in Texas in 1946.

Early life
Born on his family ranch near the Eagle Springs community in Coryell County, Texas, to Isabella Neff and her husband, Pat Neff grew up in a rural area and attended local schools. He graduated from McGregor High School. He received his bachelor's degree from Baylor University in Waco.

He worked for the next two years teaching at Southwestern Academy in Magnolia, Arkansas, to earn money to go to law school. Among his students was Harvey C. Couch, who would later become a successful entrepreneur in Arkansas.

Upon returning to Texas, Neff studied and received his law degree from the University of Texas School of Law in Austin. There, he developed a close friendship with Tom Connally and Morris Sheppard of Texas, who both became politicians and were later elected as U.S. senators from the state.

After receiving his law degree and passing the bar, on May 31, 1899, Neff married Baylor classmate Myrtle Mainer in her hometown of Lovelady. In 1901, they had a daughter, whom they named Hallie Maude. They also had a son, Pat M. Neff, Jr.

He joined the Democratic Party and entered politics, being elected in 1898 to the Texas House of Representatives, and serving from 1899 to 1905. He was elected to one term as Speaker. After returning to his law practice in Waco, Neff served for six years as the assistant county attorney and then as county attorney for McLennan County.

Public office in Texas
Considered a progressive Democrat, Neff defeated former U.S. Senator Joseph Weldon Bailey, a former populist, in the party primary for governor in 1920. This defeat effectively ended Bailey's political career. Neff handily won the general election and started his term in 1921.

Neff was a strong supporter of prohibition. He was instrumental in the development of the Texas State Parks Board. Neff and his mother, Isabella Neff, donated the land which would become the first state park in Texas. It was named Mother Neff State Park. During the resurgence of the Ku Klux Klan during his administration, Neff was criticized for not taking a stronger stance.  Neff is notable for his pardon of folk singer Lead Belly in his last days as governor.

Neff was reelected in 1922 but did not seek a third term in 1924. At the time, it was "understood" that no governor should run for a third term, although Texas did not have official term limits for the office.

In 1924 Miriam Wallace "Ma" Ferguson, wife of controversial former Governor James E. Ferguson, won the general election. The Republican nominee, George C. Butte, an American jurist who had opposed James Ferguson's line item veto of the 1917 University of Texas appropriations bill, had a stronger than usual showing. Many voters crossed party lines to vote for him, as they were unhappy with the corruption associated with "Pa" Ferguson.

President of Baylor University
After the death of Samuel Palmer Brooks, Neff was nominated to replace him as President of Baylor University. He resigned the post of President of the Board of Trustees, a position that he had held since it was vacated by B. H. Carroll in 1907, upon the nomination as President. In 1947, Neff was asked to stay on as the President by the staff at Baylor University.

President of the Southern Baptist Convention
Neff was president of the Southern Baptist Convention from 1944 to 1946.

Legacy
Pat Neff Elementary School in Houston and Pat Neff Middle School of San Antonio (Northside Independent School District) are named for Neff, as is Pat Neff Hall at Baylor.

Neff died in Waco and is interred there at Oakwood Cemetery. His papers, including those from his time as governor, are housed in The Texas Collection at Baylor University.

See also
List of Southern Baptist Convention affiliated people
Southern Baptist Convention
Southern Baptist Convention Presidents
Wahrenberger House

References

 Dorothy Blodgett, Terrell Blodgett, and David L. Scott, The Land, the Law, and the Lord: The Life of Pat Neff (2007).
 Stanley, Mark. "Booze, boomtowns, and burning crosses: The turbulent governorship of Pat M. Neff of Texas, 1921—1925," M.A. thesis, University of North Texas, 2005, 138 pages; AAT 1430156 in PROQUEST
 Neff (Pat Morris) Collection, The Texas Collection, Baylor University

External links
 
 Speeches delivered by Pat M. Neff, Governor of Texas, discussing certain phases of contemplated legislation, hosted by the Portal to Texas History]
 Messages of Pat M. Neff, Governor of Texas to the thirty-seventh legislature, hosted by the Portal to Texas History]
 Baylor University Web Site
 1933 Baylor University "Roundup" via the Baylor University Libraries Digital Collections

1871 births
1952 deaths
Burials at Oakwood Cemetery (Waco, Texas)
People from Waco, Texas
Texas lawyers
Speakers of the Texas House of Representatives
Democratic Party members of the Texas House of Representatives
Members of the Railroad Commission of Texas
University of Texas School of Law alumni
Presidents of Baylor University
Southern Baptist Convention presidents
Democratic Party governors of Texas
People from McGregor, Texas
American temperance activists